Dhamma Dewi was one of three principal queens of King Tabinshwehti of Toungoo Dynasty and the elder sister of King Bayinnaung. She was born Khin Hpone Soe, a commoner daughter of royal servants of Prince Tabinshwehti. In November 1530, the prince ascended to the throne as king, and raised her as one of his two principal queens. The queen, who was at least a year older than the king, is said to have been the king's favorite until 1545 when the king raised Khay Ma Naw as his co-chief queen.

She lived out her life in Toungoo (Taungoo), and was still alive in 1577. She attended the umbrella raising ceremony of the Maha Wizaya Pagoda by Bayinnaung in Pegu (Bago), which took place on 27 April 1577. Her brother then honored her in a separate ceremony.

References

Bibliography
 
 

Chief queens consort of Toungoo dynasty
16th-century Burmese women